Maximilian Marcus Philipp (born 1 March 1994) is a German professional footballer who plays as a forward for Bundesliga club Werder Bremen, on loan from VfL Wolfsburg. He represented Germany internationally at youth levels U20 and U21.

Club career 
Philipp started his career in his hometown club, Hertha BSC. In 2008, he joined Tennis Borussia Berlin.

SC Freiburg 
In 2012, Philipp signed with SC Freiburg. On 5 April 2014, he made his first-team debut at SC Freiburg, in a Bundesliga match against VfB Stuttgart replacing Felix Klaus in the 90th minute.

Borussia Dortmund 
On 7 June 2017, Philipp signed a five-year contract with Borussia Dortmund until 2022. The transfer fee paid to Freiburg was reported as €20 million plus bonuses. BVB's sporting director Michael Zorc described Philipp as "versatile" and "has a good shot and he has a fantastic future ahead of him." Philipp made his debut for BVB on 6 August 2017 in the team's 2–2 draw (6–7 on penalty) against Bayern Munich in DFL Super Cup, substituting for Christian Pulisic at 90' and netting BVB's second penalty. He started for Dortmund for the first time on 19 August 2017 in BVB's 3–0 away victory in Wolfsburg. On 18 September 2017, Philipp scored his first goal for BVB in the team's 5–0 home victory against 1. FC Köln. He went on to net his second goal in the same game. He made his UEFA Champions League debut on 26 September 2017 as Dortmund suffered home defeat against Real Madrid.

Dynamo Moscow 
On 9 August 2019, Philipp signed a four-year contract with the Russian club Dynamo Moscow. He scored his first goal for Dynamo three minutes into his debut game against Lokomotiv Moscow on 18 August 2019, from a direct free-kick. In his second game against FC Tambov on 24 August, he scored again as Dynamo won 2–0 away. On 23 November 2019, he scored twice from the penalty spot to secure a 2–1 victory over FC Rostov. In the next game on 1 December 2019 he scored twice again in a 2–1 defeat of Lokomotiv Moscow. He was voted player of the month for December 2019 by Dynamo fans.

VfL Wolfsburg 
On 2 October 2020, he returned to Bundesliga, joining VfL Wolfsburg on a season-long loan. In the spring of 2021, the club announced that it intends to keep Philipp in its lineup, "if the opportunity arises." However, the repayment period for a fixed amount of 11 million euros has already expired and the Germans had to negotiate with Dynamo on a new one. 

On 16 June 2021, Wolfsburg agreed on a permanent transfer with Dynamo and Philipp signed a four-year contract with the club.

Werder Bremen 
Philipp joined league rivals Werder Bremen on loan in January 2023. He signed as a replacement for Oliver Burke, who went on loan to Millwall. In 11 February 2023, Philipp made his debut against his former club Borussia Dortmund as a substitute for Christian Groß.

Career statistics

Club

Honours 
SC Freiburg
2. Bundesliga: 2015–16
Germany U21
 UEFA European Under-21 Championship: 2017

References

External links 
 

Living people
1994 births
Association football midfielders
German footballers
Footballers from Berlin
Germany youth international footballers
Germany under-21 international footballers
Bundesliga players
2. Bundesliga players
Russian Premier League players
FC Energie Cottbus II players
SC Freiburg players
Borussia Dortmund players
FC Dynamo Moscow players
VfL Wolfsburg players
SV Werder Bremen players
German expatriate footballers
German expatriate sportspeople in Russia
Expatriate footballers in Russia